2015 FIBA Oceania Under-16 Championship was an international under-16 basketball tournament staged in August 2015 by FIBA Oceania. The teams taking part represented Australia, New Caledonia, New Zealand and Tahiti. The venues were St. Patrick's College and TSB Bank Arena in Wellington, New Zealand. The winning team was Australia.

Group Phase

Bronze medal game

Final

References

External links 
 FIBA Oceania U-16 Championship

Under-16 Championship
Oceania
under
FIBA